Roberto Gonzalez (born 1955) is a Chicano artist, curator, and musician. He was a member of the San Antonio-based Con Safo art group in the mid-1970s. As an artist, he has exhibited locally, nationally, and internationally. Gonzalez worked primarily as an abstract artist from the 1970s until the early 2000s, after which time he emphasized pre-Columbian imagery in an effort to engage with his ancestors. He has also worked as a performance artist since 1974. Gonzalez has curated numerous exhibitions, notably at the Carver Cultural Center in San Antonio, where he served as the Fine Arts Administrator (1984-1995). Gonzalez is also a percussion musician who specializes in Pre-Hispanic and African Diaspora music. He has  trained with several African Diaspora music masters and has been active in several musical groups.

Biography 
Born in Laredo, Texas to parents from Coahuila, Mexico, Gonzalez moved to San Antonio at the age of eleven. After returning to Laredo, he graduated in 1971 from St. Joseph’s Academy. Gonzalez moved to San Antonio, where Mel Casas, his professor at San Antonio College (SAC),  invited him to join the Con Safo group. Gonzalez received a B.A. in painting from Trinity University in San Antonio in 1978. In 1980, he earned  a B.B.A. from the University of the Incarnate Word. Gonzalez curated over 200 exhibitions at the Carver Cultural Center in San Antonio.

Exhibitions

The Con Safo group period 
Gonzalez joined the Con Safo art group by April, 1974, and he was active in the group until it came to an end in 1976. In San Antonio, he participated in Con Safo exhibitions at: Assumption Seminary (1974), Saint Mary’s University (1975), the Institute of Texan Cultures (1975). He was also part of the following Con Safo exhibitions outside of San Antonio: North Texas State, Denton (1974), the University of Oklahoma, Norman (1974), Crystal City High School (1975), College of the Mainland, Texas City (1975).

Group exhibitions 
Gonzalez's work has been featured in numerous group exhibitions in Texas as well as the following: The Polyforum Siqueiros, Mexico City (1982), El Museo del Barrio, New York City (1984), the Plaza de la Raza, Los Angeles (1984), the Museo Carrillo Gil, Mexico City (1990), and the University of British Columbia Museum of Anthropology, Vancouver, Canada (2022).

Solo exhibitions 
Solo exhibitions in San Antonio:
 The Carver Cultural Center (1978-1979)
 The San Antonio Museum of Modern Art (1979)
 The Luna Notte Gallery (1996)
 The Carver Cultural Center (2013)
 Salon Sanchez (2014)
 Centro de Artes (2016)
 St. Philip’s College (2016)

Artistic style 
The artist developed a "decal" transfer process in which he paints on plastic, and, after the paint has dried, he transfers it onto the canvas with a layer of gel he puts on the canvas. While the plastic is still affixed to the canvas, Gonzalez then cuts linear channels into it, through which he sprays gold or silver-colored paint to create outlines. This process is discussed in connection with the painting "Ollin" in "Glasstire," which includes a process shot.

Gonzalez also sometimes works in a more conventional manner by drawing or painting directly on a black canvas, in   his "Dreamstack" series.

Selected works 
 “Esid,” 1979, acrylic on canvas, 88 x 67 inches.
 “Rau,” 2010, acrylic on canvas, 90 x 78 inches.
 “Kociyo,” 2014, acrylic on canvas, 80 x 64 inches. 
 “Cocijo,” 2014, acrylic on canvas, 134 x 70 inches.
 “Ollin” 2016, acrylic on canvas, 10 x 16 feet.
 "Una Limpia de Colón: Eres un Conquistador" (A Columbus/colon Cleansing: You are a Conquistador), 2018, acrylic with gold and silver leaf on canvas, 90 x 78 inches.
 "El Paso 8/3/19, No Hate, No Fear" (diptych), 2019, acrylic on canvas, 40 x 96 inches (each panel). This diptych has been discussed in several publications in Canada, Mexico, and the U.S.
 "DreamStack Series: Adicto Al Peligros" (Addicted to Danger), 2019, acrylic on canvas, 96 x 40 inches. Gonzalez' inscription “Alta Souciedad” (high trash) is an insulting transformation of  the phrase “alta sociadad” (high society).

Awards 

 Indonesian Government's Pemerintah Propinsi Daerah Tingkat I Jawa Barat Award (1986)
 Texas Commission on the Arts Artist in Residence (1998-2002) 
 Urban-15 Artist in Residence (2002-2003) 
 The San Antonio Department for Culture and Creative Development's “Creative of the Month,” June, 2016

References 

Living people
1955 births
People from Laredo, Texas
American artists
American curators
American musicians
Chicano art
Abstract art